Peconic County is a proposed new county on Long Island in the U.S. state of New York that would secede the five easternmost towns of Suffolk County: East Hampton, Riverhead, Shelter Island, Southampton and Southold, plus the Shinnecock Indian Reservation.

It derives its name from Peconic Bay which is the dividing body of water separating the North and South forks of Long Island.

Peconic County has been discussed for more than 50 years – ever since Suffolk County moved its offices from the official county seat in Riverhead 32 miles west to Hauppauge, New York, in more densely populated western Suffolk County.

The big drive for the county was a difference in character between western Suffolk County which is predominantly a New York City bedroom community while the east end (or "East End") is dominated by home owners who want to preserve the area's more rural and upscale character.

In 1997, 71 percent of the east end voters approved a nonbinding resolution to secede. However, the New York State Assembly has never approved the enabling legislation. East End newspapers speculated that the Assembly was afraid that it would encourage a wave of secessions in the state including Staten Island seceding from New York City and perhaps even causing the division of upstate and downstate New York.

The secession movement has not been active in recent years.

Area and population
At the 2020 census, the five towns and the Shinnecock Reservation had a land area of 900.581 km² (347.72 mi²), or about 38.12 percent of Suffolk County's land area. Its total population was 161,127 inhabitants, or about 10.56 percent of the county's population. Its average population density was 178.91/km² (463.38/mi²). If the proposed secession were to occur, the surviving Suffolk County would have a land area of 1,462.001 km² (564.482 mi²) and an adjusted 2020 census population of 1,356,575 inhabitants. It would be left with a population density of 933.51/km² (2,417.78/mi²). As can be seen, the western part of Suffolk has more than five times the population density of its eastern neighbor.

Places within the proposed county

See also 
 Adirondack County - another proposed county in New York
 Brookhaven County - an adjacent proposed county in New York made from the Town of Brookhaven.

References

Politics of New York (state)
Proposed counties of the United States
~Proposed
Suffolk County, New York